Cho Eun-young (born 14 November 1995) is a South Korean sport shooter who plays for Cheongju City. She competed in the 2020 Summer Olympics.

References

External links
 

1995 births
Living people
South Korean female sport shooters
ISSF rifle shooters
Olympic shooters of South Korea
Shooters at the 2020 Summer Olympics
Place of birth missing (living people)